Nkuv is a farming village of Nso people, about  from Kumbo town, Bui Division, in the North-West Region of Cameroon. It has a population of about 2000 inhabitants, however, many seasonal farmers who reside in Dzeng, Bamdzeng, Mbiame, Kingomen, Mbuluf, Shisong and Kumbo also own and operate farms in Nkuv. The Kumbo Urban council for example has a farm project in Nkuv called The Nkuv Palm Plantation project.

Farming
Farming in Nkuv is principally subsistence farming, with the farmers cultivating corn, beans, cassava, bananas, plantains, yams, soybeans, groundnuts (or peanuts) and others. Like other grassland villages, Nkuv has two season: dry season and rainy season.
Rainy season is an intense farming season and usually starts in March when the first rains announce the commencement of planting, especially corn, beans, and groundnuts. Sometimes planting may be delayed depending on how heavy the first rains are and how wet the soil gets. In recent past there has been a lot of fluctuation in first rains and consequently planting. Moreover, yield on the last decade has not been very impressive in Nkuv, pushing inhabitants and new arrivals to go deeper down to Nte-ev towards the Bamoun-Nso boundary.

References

Populated places in Cameroon